Dungarvan GAA is a GAA club based in Dungarvan, County Waterford, Republic of Ireland. The club participates in both hurling and Gaelic football. The club currently heads the roll of honour in the Waterford Senior Football Championship with a total of 19 wins.

The club attracted significant national attention in 2020 when a player competed in the final of the Waterford Intermediate Football Championship despite awaiting the result of a COVID-19 test, which returned a positive result. This led to Dungarvan (that year's competition-winning club) being stripped of the title.

Notable players
Jamie Nagle

Honours
Waterford Senior Hurling Championships: 7
 1890, 1908, 1917, 1920, 1923, 1926, 1941
Waterford Senior Football Championships: 19
  1892, 1893, 1908,1916,1926, 1927, 1928, 1929, 1930, 1937, 1938, 1945, 1946, 1947, 1948, 1954, 1990, 1991, 1992
 Waterford Intermediate Hurling Championships: 3
 1978, 1986, 2009
 Waterford Intermediate Football Championships: 3
 1985, 2011, 2017
 Waterford Junior Hurling Championships: 1
 1975
 Waterford Junior Football Championships: 3
 1909, 1914, 1973
 Waterford Under-21 Hurling Championships: 1
 1987
 Waterford Under-21 Football Championships: 3
 1985, 1987, 2010
 Waterford Minor Hurling Championships: 12
 1929, 1931, 1940, 1941, 1942, 1943, 1944, 1951, 1966, 1983, 1984, 2012
 Waterford Minor Football Championships: 9
  1928, 1932, 1933, 1961, 1983, 1984, 1991, 1992, 2013

References

External links
Official website

Dungarvan
Gaelic games clubs in County Waterford
Gaelic football clubs in County Waterford
Hurling clubs in County Waterford